No Berlusconi Day was a spontaneous mass political event organised by the Purple People and held worldwide on December 5, 2009. The protest was organized almost entirely through the Internet. The supporters were also known as Onda Viola ("Purple Wave"), because of the color chosen to distinguish the event, and widely used by all of the participants.

Background
The main idea behind the event was to show protest and dissatisfaction against Silvio Berlusconi's public image. Berlusconi, Italian Prime Minister at the time, was involved in a consistent amount of sex scandals, brought to court for financial crimes, and accused by many mobbers to be involved with the mafia organizations.

Organization
On October 6, 2009 the so-called "lodo Alfano", one of Berlusconi's "ad personam" laws, was sentenced to be against Italy's Constitutional principles of equality by the Constitutional Court. A small group of bloggers started to comment on the sentence through internet's social networks, and later proposed a public protest against Silvio Berlusconi.

The proposal was successful, and spread across social networks: in less than a week the "No Berlusconi Day" page reached over 20,000 members. The project was joined by people from all over Italy; local groups were created and people started to get organized.

In late October an official date was decided, December the 5th, and the main venue was to be Rome.

People from all over the country and all over the world kept joining in, and by early November registered supporters had boomed to 200,000.

The event
The No Berlusconi Day started on December 5, at 4:00 am, Rome time schedule, when the No Berlusconi Day group from Sydney gathered. The events kept going on for the whole day, since No Berlusconi Day demonstrations took place all over the world: Berlin, Paris, London, Buenos Aires, Madrid, New York City and even Beijing.

The main group of supported was planned to round up in Rome.

The program was respected almost flawlessly. The participants met in Piazza della Repubblica and started marching at 14:00, towards piazza S. Giovanni; they passed through via Cavour, piazza S. Maria Maggiore and via Merulana. The main stage was built in Piazza San Giovanni, and the first speaker started his speech at 16:30. Many others contributions followed until 18:30, when the veteran songwriter Roberto Vecchioni buckled the day with a 30' concert.

Notable supporters
Many prominent public figures supported the No Berlusconi Day; among them were: Antonio Di Pietro, Walter Veltroni, Nanni Moretti, Daniele Luttazzi, Paolo Flores d'Arcais, Beppe Grillo, Dario Fo, Dacia Maraini, Margherita Hack, Piero Ricca, Sabina Guzzanti, Roberto Vecchioni, Moni Ovadia, Salvatore Borsellino, Piergiorgio Odifreddi, Vincenzo Vita

Media coverage and Parties' attention
The event immediately attracted the media's attention, and members of the No Berlusconi-day staff appeared in TV news and were interviewed by major Italian newspapers. Most of them were ordinary people, rather unheard of by the greater public, but sometimes popular in the bloggers' community.

This people's uproar forced the main opposition party - the PD- to declare his position as far as supporting the No Berlusconi Day. The PD Secretary, Pierluigi Bersani, anyway remained somehow ambiguous, thus creating much disillusion in the Party's supporters and staff.

References

External links
Official website
National news coverage
No Berlusconi Day London  - short film
News coverage by TF1, french 1st national channel
News coverage by Spanish National Television

2009 in politics
2009 protests
Political events
Protests in Italy
Protests in the European Union
Cultural depictions of Silvio Berlusconi